Bibus is reference management software designed for OpenOffice.org packages and Microsoft Word in particular, with  goal  of creating an open source bibliographic software package that will allow easy formatting  of the bibliographic index in OpenOffice.org Writer and Microsoft Word.  It is based on Python and wxWidgets, making it platform-independent in principle. It functions on all 32-bit versions of Microsoft Windows (95/98/NT/2000/XP), POSIX (Linux/BSD/UNIX-like OSes) and, to a limited extent, Mac OS X. Bibus is free software released under the GNU GPL v2+.

Features include searching and reference uploading from MEDLINE using eTBLAST or PubMed and user reference library independence, making document exchange between collaborative writers easier.

Command line version is found in github (https://github.com/linsujie/bibcmd) python3 version is found in sourceforge (https://sourceforge.net/projects/biblioassist/)

See also
 Comparison of reference management software

External links

Innovation.swmed.edu
Wiki.servies.openoffice.org

Free software programmed in Python
Software that uses wxWidgets